Sidney or Sid Taylor may refer to:

Sidney H. Taylor Field
Sidney Taylor, character in After Tomorrow
Sid Taylor, see Theodore Racing